The Ornithologist is a 2016 drama film directed by João Pedro Rodrigues. It was released in 2016.

The film stars Paul Hamy as Fernando, an ornithologist studying black storks in Portugal, who is drawn into a series of incidents paralleling the life of Saint Anthony of Padua.

Director João Pedro Rodrigues has described his film as a “purposefully transgressive and blasphemous reappropriation of the saint’s life.”

Plot
Fernando is out in nature camping on riverbank birdwatching in Portugal. He gets into his yellow kayak watching all kinds of beautiful birds. He is so intent looking through his binoculars his kayak is swept into rapids and capsizes.

Two Chinese women Fei and Lin are hiking through the woods and they find Fernando's body.  The one woman is afraid and the other sees a duty to try and help.  They resuscitate Fernando. He speaks Portuguese and the Chinese women don't but English allows them to communicate. He explains that they are lost and far off their route.  The women are afraid of the forest spirits and he appears to be a non-believer. The women tie the man up in ropes from a tree. They ignore his pleas and promises of help. During the night he frees himself and he climbs high up a cliff for safety.  His phone will not work.

After a strange night of a full moon with tribal men dancing around a fire and the ritual killing of a boar, Fernando finds Jesus. Jesus is a deaf and mute goat herder.  Both men distrust the other but after Jesus goes swimming naked Fernando joins him. Jesus shares his food, they sunbathe and Fernando shows Jesus how his binoculars work.  They make love.  Jesus uses his whistle and dog to round up his goats. Fernando sees that Jesus has his sweatshirt and gets angry.  Jesus pulls out his knife and the two men fight.  Fernando stabs and kills Jesus.

Fernando continues his journey finding an apple tree and bird eggs for food.  He finds an old abandoned mission abbey with statues of saints and angels.
He talks to some Koi fish in a pond and wonders did they survive the flood and who feeds them.  He hears the sound of a horn and three topless women on horses are hunting with their dogs.  There are elk and deer in the woods.  The woman shoots an elk that disappears and Fernando looks as if he was hit by a bullet.  She asks him is he Ok? They offer food and help. Is he lost? After he assures them he is fine they ride off.

The surreal experiences continue with a white dove watching him. He comes upon a dead body and he breathes it back to life. He died last night dancing with his friends.  Who are you and am I dead?  He tells him that he is Anthony.  The now living man says that he is Thomas.  Some things you can not understand but just believe. A spirit just burns within us.  Should I believe a lie? I know I am dead. Anthony answers it is only a lie to you. You never died.  You have my brother's whistle and knife.  Did you kill Jesus?  I am a new man and am here to correct a wrong.  Thomas slices the neck of Fernando.

You hear the horn of a truck and see the city sign of Padua.  Jesus and Anthony are walking into town and across the street, the two Chinese women are waving and shouting friendly greetings.

Cast 
 Paul Hamy as Fernando
 Xelo Cagiao as Jesus / Thomas (the brother of Jesus)
 João Pedro Rodrigues as Anthony
 Han Wen as Fei 
 Chan Suan as Lin
 Juliane Elting as Blonde Hunter
 Flora Bulcão as Hunter 1
 Isabelle Puntel as Hunter 2
 Alexandre Alverca, André Freitas, David Silva Pereira, Gil Mendes Da Silva, Miguel Ângelo Marujo, Nuno Santos, Ricardo Jorge as caretos

Awards

References

External links
 

Films directed by João Pedro Rodrigues
Brazilian multilingual films
French multilingual films
Portuguese multilingual films
2016 films
Films about religion
Portuguese drama films
Portuguese LGBT-related films
French drama films
French LGBT-related films
Brazilian drama films
Brazilian LGBT-related films
LGBT-related drama films
2016 LGBT-related films
Mirandese-language films
2016 drama films
2016 multilingual films
2010s French films